Helen Mayerlin Maolo Gosálvez (born 23 December 1988) is a Bolivian footballer who plays as a centre back for Mundo Futuro. She was a member of the Bolivia women's national team.

Early life
Maolo is originally from the Beni Department and moved to the Santa Cruz Department.

International career
Maolo played for Bolivia at senior level in the 2014 Copa América Femenina. She also played a friendly against Brazil in 2017.

References

1988 births
Living people
Women's association football central defenders
Bolivian women's footballers
People from Vaca Díez Province
People from Santa Cruz Department (Bolivia)
Bolivia women's international footballers